Viles may refer to:

People
 Heather Viles, English academic

Places
 Viles Arboretum, United States
 Viles or Villesse, Italy